Marc Bolan's Rock Shrine is a memorial to Marc Bolan, of glam-rock band T. Rex, on the site where he died in a car crash in Barnes, London, on 16 September 1977. Bolan was a passenger in a car which hit a part-metal and wood fence and then a sycamore tree on Queen's Ride (part of the B306, close to Gipsy Lane). A memorial stone was unveiled at the site in 1997, and a bust of Bolan added in 2002.

Origins

Marc Bolan died, aged 29, from injuries sustained when his purple Mini, driven by his girlfriend Gloria Jones, crashed. Jones lost control of the car and it struck a steel reinforced chain link fence post, and came to rest against a sycamore tree after failing to negotiate a small humpback bridge, near Gipsy Lane on Queens Ride, Barnes, south-west London. From the day of the accident the site became a place of pilgrimage to Bolan fans and this was reported in various newspapers from 1978 onwards. Coincidentally the registration number of the car was FOX 661L and within the lyrics of his single "Solid Gold Easy Action" are the lines "Easy as picking foxes from a tree" and "Woman from the east with her headlights shining"

In September 1997, the Performing Right Society (PRS) installed a memorial stone for Bolan, facing into Gipsy Lane at the base of the embankment from the "Bolan Tree" located in Queen's Ride. In 1999 the T-Rex Action Group (TAG) was formed with the specific aim of caring for the site. TAG were granted an in perpetuity lease on the site with ownership and full responsibility for the "Bolan Tree". During 2000, TAG built steps up the muddy embankment between the "Bolan Tree" on Queen's Ride and the PRS memorial stone facing Gipsy Lane and took the action needed to make the tree safe so that the threat of falling was removed.

In 2002, a bronze bust of Bolan paid for exclusively by T-Rex Action Group founder Fee Warner, and sculpted by Canadian sculptor Jean Robillard, was unveiled by Bolan's only child – Rolan Bolan.

In 2005, memorial plaques were fitted to the steps to remember other members of T.Rex who have also died: Steve Peregrin Took, Steve Currie, Mickey Finn and Dino Dines. A memorial plaque was also included for Marc Bolan's wife June Bolan (née Child) as recognition for her contribution to his success.

Official recognition 
In February 2007,  the 30th anniversary year of Marc Bolan's death, the work done by the T-Rex Action Group since 1999 was recognised by the English Tourist Board's publication of its new guide England Rocks which features 113 "Sites of Rock 'n' Roll Importance" in England. In London, 29 sites are listed, but many are "general sites" such as Abbey Road and Wembley Stadium which are not "person-specific". Only Marc Bolan, Jimi Hendrix and Freddie Mercury are listed in the guide in their own right.

See also
 List of public art in Richmond upon Thames

References

External links

TAG’s Marc Bolan & T-Rex website – Legal Guardians of Marc Bolan's Rock Shrine

1970s establishments in England
Barnes, London
Monuments and memorials in London
Shrines
Tourist attractions in the London Borough of Richmond upon Thames